Dave Wilson (born 24 December 1942) is an English former professional footballer who played as a right winger.

Career
Born in Nelson, Lancashire, Wilson played for Preston North End, Liverpool, Bradford City, Southport and Telford United.

After signing for Waterford United, he made his League of Ireland debut at Lourdes Stadium on 3 March 1974.

References

1942 births
Living people
English footballers
England under-23 international footballers
Preston North End F.C. players
Liverpool F.C. players
Bradford City A.F.C. players
Southport F.C. players
Telford United F.C. players
English Football League players
Waterford F.C. players
League of Ireland players
Association football wingers
FA Cup Final players